Marc Andre Manga Epresse Priso (born 16 January 1988) is French professional footballer who plays as a striker.

Career
After trialling with Hereford United in the previous summer, Manga signed on non-contract terms with Rochdale in October 2009. Manga made three appearances for Rochdale, two in the Football League and one in the FA Cup, before being released in November 2009.

References

Association football forwards
French footballers
Rochdale A.F.C. players
English Football League players
1988 births
Living people